Hugo Martín Nervo (born January 6, 1991) is an Argentine professional footballer who plays as a defender for Liga MX club Atlas.

Club career
Nervo made his league debut for Arsenal de Sarandí in a 1–1 draw with San Lorenzo on April 3, 2009, for the 2009 Clausura tournament.

International career
Nervo was called by coach Sergio Batista for the Argentina U-21 national team that finished third in the 2009 Toulon Tournament. The following year, he was selected for the Argentine U-20 squad to play the 2011 South American Youth Championship.

Honours
Arsenal de Sarandí
Argentine Primera División: 2012 Clausura

Atlas
Liga MX: Apertura 2021, Clausura 2022
Campeón de Campeones: 2022

Individual
Liga MX Best XI: Clausura 2022
Liga MX Best Defender: 2021–22
Liga MX All-Star: 2022

References

External links
 
 
 

Living people
1991 births
Sportspeople from Buenos Aires Province
Association football central defenders
Argentine footballers
Argentine expatriate footballers
Argentina under-20 international footballers
Arsenal de Sarandí footballers
Club Atlético Huracán footballers
Santos Laguna footballers
Atlas F.C. footballers
Argentine Primera División players
Liga MX players
Expatriate footballers in Mexico
Argentine expatriate sportspeople in Mexico
Footballers at the 2011 Pan American Games
Pan American Games medalists in football
Pan American Games silver medalists for Argentina
Medalists at the 2011 Pan American Games